is a Japanese tokusatsu minidrama (crossover special) based on the Toei's long-running Super Sentai metaseries featuring cast members from past installments and acts as a prelude to the events of Kishiryu Sentai Ryusoulger. It aired from February 17, 2019, following the finale of Kaitou Sentai Lupinranger VS Keisatsu Sentai Patranger, until March 10, 2019, alongside Kamen Rider Zi-O in the Super Hero Time line-up on TV Asahi affiliate stations.

Plot
The heroes are told that any wish they desire will come true if they can win the “Super Sentai Greatest Battle” tournament, the 160 heroes divided into 32 teams of five to compete against each other to have their wishes granted while contending with the mysterious Gaisoulg who seeks worthy opponents to battle.

Cast
: 
: 
: 
: 
: 
: 
: 
: 
Introduction Voice:

Guest cast
: 
: 
: 
: 
: 
: 
: 
: 
:

Episodes
The episodes are called "Battles".

Theme song

Lyrics: 
Composition: 
Arrangement: 
Artist: NoB

References

External links
 at TV Asahi
 at Toei Company

Super Sentai
2019 Japanese television series debuts
2019 Japanese television series endings
Crossover tokusatsu television series